The Austria national under-17 football team represents Austria in international football at this age level and is controlled by the Austrian Football Association, the governing body for football in Austria.

FIFA U-17 World Cup record

UEFA European Under-17 Championship record

Current squad
 The following players were called up for the 2023 UEFA European Under-17 Championship qualification matches.
 Match dates: 20–26 October 2022
 Opposition: ,  and 
Caps and goals correct as of: 24 September 2022, after the match against

See also
 Austria men's national football team
 Austria women's national under-17 football team

References

 

F
European national under-17 association football teams